Special districts (also known as special service districts, special district governments, limited purpose entities, or special-purpose districts) are independent, special-purpose governmental units that exist separately from local governments such as county, municipal, and township governments, with substantial administrative and fiscal independence. They are formed to perform a single function or a set of related functions. The term special district governments as defined by the U.S. Census Bureau excludes school districts.  In 2017, the U.S. had more than 51,296 special district governments.

Census definition 
The United States Census counts government units across all States. This includes "special districts." To count the special districts the Census must define the special districts so as to address all such governmental entities across the broad spectrum of 50 states' definitions and interpretations. The Census's full definition is:Special district governments are independent, special purpose governmental units, other than school district governments, that exist as separate entities with substantial administrative and fiscal independence from general purpose local governments. As defined for Census Bureau statistics on governments, the term ‘‘special district governments’’ excludes school district governments as they are defined as a separate governmental type.

 Special district governments provide specific services that are not being supplied by existing general purpose governments. Most perform a single function, but in some instances, their enabling legislation allows them to provide several, usually related, types of services. The services provided by these districts range from such basic social needs  as hospitals and fire protection, to the less conspicuous tasks of mosquito abatement and upkeep of cemeteries.

 The Census Bureau classification of special district governments covers a wide variety of entities, most of which are officially called districts or authorities. Not all public agencies so termed, however, represent separate governments. Many entities that carry the designation ‘‘district’’ or ‘‘authority’’ are, by law, so closely related to county, municipal, town or township, or state governments that they are classified as subordinate agencies of those governments in Census Bureau statistics on governments, and are not counted as separate special district governments.

 In order to be classified as a special district government, rather than as a subordinate agency, an entity must possess three attributes—existence as an organized entity, governmental character, and substantial autonomy. Each state description also lists various statutory authorities, commissions, corporations, and other forms of organizations that have certain governmental characteristics, but are subject by law to administrative or fiscal control by the state or by independent local governments; therefore, they are classified as subordinate agencies of those governments.

Characteristics

Special districts serve limited areas and have governing boards that accomplish legislatively assigned functions using public funds.

Governing body

Each district is governed by a board of directors, commissioners, board of supervisors, or the like. These boards may be appointed by public officials, appointed by private entities, popularly elected, or elected by benefited citizens (typically, property owners). Sometimes, one or more public officials will serve as an ex officio member on the board.

The board of a special district serves primarily as a managing board and often appoints a chief executive for day-to-day operations and decision making and policy implementation. In the New England states, special districts are often run in the same town meeting fashion as other local governments. Most districts have employees, but some districts exist solely to raise funds by issuing bonds and/or by providing tax increment financing.

Functions

Special districts perform many functions including airports, ports, highways, mass transit, parking facilities, fire protection, libraries, parks, cemeteries, hospitals, irrigation, conservation, sewerage, wastewater treatment, solid waste, fiber optic systems, stadiums, water supply, electric power, and natural gas utility.

Legal basis
Special districts are authorized by state law and must have public foundation, civil office, and public accountability.

State law

Special districts in the United States are founded by some level of government in accordance with state law  (either constitutional amendment, general law, or special acts) and exist in all states.  Special districts are legally separate entities with at least some corporate powers. Districts are created by legislative action, court action, or public referendum.  The procedures for creating a special district may include procedures such as petitions, hearings, voter or landowner approval, or government approval. Tribal governments may create special districts pursuant to state law and may serve on the boards of special districts.

Public foundation

Special districts, like all public entities, have public foundation. The landmark case of the U.S. Supreme Court addressing public versus private charters was Dartmouth College v. Woodward in 1819.  Dartmouth established the fundamental differences between public and private organizations. Critically, a government must be founded by all of the people of a governmental area or by their governmental representatives.

Civil office

Special districts possess some form of civil office, that is, the board has received a delegation of sovereign power from the state. Some boards may be appointed by only landowners.  Private entities may appoint some or all of the members of a special district; however, there must be evidence of civil office. In addition to special districts with privately appointed boards, a special district may have a privately founded board; however, such a board could not be given the power to set a tax.

Accountability

There is a citizen-government fiscal accountability relationship. To maintain accountability for special districts, states must maintain ultimate control (the power to repeal the authorizing law at any time). Due to public foundation and, thus, ultimate control, the state can freely delegate sovereign power (such as the power to tax) to special districts and can allow them to act autonomously with little supervision.

History

There is little information available on the earliest special districts in the United States. It is known that park districts existed in the 18th century. Toll road and canal corporations existed in the 19th century. The first general statute authorizing irrigation districts was adopted by California in 1887. The U.S. Census Bureau began identifying and collecting data on special districts in 1942.

English custom 
Special districts in the United States follow the English custom. The earliest known general law in England authorizing special purpose authorities was the Statute of Sewers of 1532. Single purpose authorities created by individual charters also existed at the time. However, the early authorities were temporary and unconnected to local government structure. The first laws authorizing permanent authorities connected to local governments were the Incorporated Guardians of the Poor, which were created by special acts in the 17th century. Turnpike trusts were an early and popular special purpose authority in England. Internal drainage boards are current examples in parts of England and Wales.

Trends

The state of Illinois leads the nation in the number of special districts with California close behind.  State counts of their special districts may differ from the federal count because the states may have different definitions of a special district than the U.S. Census Bureau.

Examples

All of the following examples have been found by the U.S. Census Bureau to be special districts.  See the Census of Governments Government Organization publications at a depository library or visit https://www.census.gov and select Governments Division.
 Alabama: Alabama Municipal Electric Authority
 Alaska: regional electrical authorities (general law)
 Arizona: Valley Metro Regional Public Transportation Authority
 Arkansas: fire ant abatement districts (general law)
 California: Golden Gate Bridge, Highway and Transportation District
 Colorado: Regional Transportation District
 Connecticut: Pomperaug Valley Water Authority (special act)
 Delaware: tax ditches (general law)
 Florida: Jacksonville Aviation Authority
 Georgia: Atlanta BeltLine Special Services District
 Hawaii: Central Maui Soil & Water Conservation District
 Idaho: auditorium districts (general law)
 Illinois: Cook Memorial Public Library District
 Indiana: Northwest Indiana Regional Development Authority (special act)
 Iowa: library districts (joint or regional) (general law)
 Kansas: industrial districts (general law)
 Kentucky: Highview Fire Protection District
 Louisiana: West Jefferson Levee District
 Maine: cemetery districts (special acts)
 Maryland: water and sewer authorities (general law)
 Massachusetts: Holyoke Water Works
 Michigan: Huron–Clinton Metroparks
 Minnesota: Metropolitan Mosquito Control District
 Mississippi: lighting districts (special acts)
 Missouri: Jackson County Sports Complex Authority (special act)
 Montana: county rail authorities (general law)
 Nebraska: Omaha Public Power District
 Nevada: Las Vegas–Clark County Library District
 New Hampshire: housing authorities (general law)
 New Jersey: New Jersey Turnpike Authority
 New Mexico: cotton boll weevil control districts (general law)
 New York: Port Washington Parking District
 North Carolina: Research Triangle Regional Public Transit Authority (special act)
 North Dakota: Minot Park District
 Ohio: Northeast Ohio Regional Sewer District
 Oklahoma: public library systems (general law)
 Oregon: Tualatin Hills Park & Recreation District
 Pennsylvania: Philadelphia Regional Port Authority
 Rhode Island: East Providence Special Development District Commission (special act)
 South Carolina: St. John's Fire District
 South Dakota: television translator districts (general law)
 Tennessee: utility districts (general law)
 Texas: Palacios Seawall Commission (special act)
 Utah: Liberty Cemetary Maintenance District
 Vermont: Vermont Public Power Supply Authority (special act)
 Virginia: Buchanan County Tourist Train Development Authority (special act)
 Washington: Independent health districts
 West Virginia: Hatfield-McCoy Regional Recreation Authority
 Wisconsin: Milwaukee Metropolitan Sewerage District
 Wyoming: Baggs Solid Waste Disposal District

See also
 District
 Joint powers authority
 Local government in the United States
 Public-benefit nonprofit corporation

References

Further reading
 Friedman, L. M. A history of American law. (3rd). Simon & Schuster: New York. 2005.
 Krane, D., Rigos, P. N., and Hill, M. B. Home rule in America: A fifty-state handbook. CQ Press. 2001.
 Mergent's Municipal and Government Manual
 Zimmerman, J. F. The New England town meeting. Greenwood Publishing Group. 1997.

External links
 A Citizen's Guide to Special Districts in California 
 California Special Districts Association
 Special Districts Association of Oregon
 Oregon Special Districts Fact Sheets
 U.S. Census Bureau
  U.S. Census Bureau/Governments Organization/Volume 1
  Government Accounting Standards Board
  2006 Government Finance and Employment Classification Manual, U.S. Census Bureau
 2007 Governments Integrated Directory, U.S. Census Bureau
  IRS tax-exempt bond information 
  Municipal Research and Services Center of Washington
  Florida Department of Economic Opportunity, Special District Accountability Program
 State and Local Government Review - current and past issues
 Bloomberg News
 Last Week Tonight with John Oliver: Special Districts (HBO)

Types of administrative division